SWIFT message types are the format or schema used to send messages to financial institutions on the SWIFT network. The original message types were developed by SWIFT and a subset was retrospectively made into an ISO standard, ISO 15022. In many instances, SWIFT message types between custodians follow the ISO standard. This was later supplemented by a XML based version under ISO 20022.

Composition of MT number
SWIFT messages consist of five blocks of data including three headers, message content, and a trailer. Message types are crucial to identifying content. 

All SWIFT messages include the literal "MT" (message type/text). This is followed by a three-digit number that denotes the message category, group and type. Consider the following two examples.   

Example 1  

MT304

 The first digit (3) represents the category. A category denotes messages that relate to particular financial instruments or services such as precious metals (6), treasury (3), or traveller's cheques (8). The category denoted by 3 is treasury markets
 The second digit (0) represents a group of related parts in a transaction life cycle. The group indicated by 0 is a financial institution transfer.
 The third digit (4) is the type that denotes the specific message. There are several hundred message types across the categories. The type represented by 4 is a notification.

A MT304 message is considered an "Advice/Instruction of a Third Party Deal" and it used to advise of or instruct the settlement of a third party foreign exchange deal.  For example, an asset manager who executed a FX transaction with a broker would send a MT304 instruction to the custodian bank of the client.

Example 2

MT103

 The first digit (1) represents the category. The category denoted by 1 is customer payments and cheques.
 The second digit (0) represents a group of related parts in a transaction life cycle. The group indicated by 0 is a financial institution transfer.
 The third digit (3) is the type that denotes the specific message. There are several hundred message types across the categories. The type represented by 3 is a notification.

A MT103 message is considered a "Single Customer Credit Transfer" and is used to instruct a funds transfer.

Overview of SWIFT MT categories 
The table below shows the different categories and the message type descriptions.

ISO 15022 MT    
Although ISO 15022 message types are different in their structure than the SWIFT MT, the naming convention remains the same.

See also
 Delivery versus payment
 ISO 9362 (standard format for SWIFT IDs)
 Market data
 MT202 COV
 MT940

External links
 Message standards supported by the SWIFT network: 
 Message types defined in ISO15022

References

Society for Worldwide Interbank Financial Telecommunication